Mary Foley may refer to:

 Mary Cleophas Foley (1845–1928), Superior General of the Sisters of Providence of Saint Mary-of-the-Woods, Indiana
 Mary Jo Foley, American freelance technology writer